Hypnotic Eye is the thirteenth and final studio album by American rock band Tom Petty and the Heartbreakers, released in the UK on July 28, 2014 and in the United States on July 29, by Reprise Records. The album debuted at No. 1 on the Billboard 200, becoming the only Tom Petty and the Heartbreakers album ever to top the chart. Hypnotic Eye was nominated for the 2015 Grammy Award for Best Rock Album. It would also be the Heartbreakers' final studio album before disbanding in 2017, following Petty's death in October of that same year.

Background
The first sessions for the album occurred in August 2011 at the band's Los Angeles-based rehearsal space, the "Clubhouse," where the song "Burnt-Out Town" was recorded. The album marks a stylistic return to the band's first two albums, Tom Petty and the Heartbreakers (1976) and You're Gonna Get It! (1978).

Promotion
On June 10, 2014, the song "American Dream Plan B" was released as the lead single from the album, along with two additional tracks, "Red River" and "U Get Me High," from the band's website and digital stores. A month later, a CD single with "American Dream Plan B" and "U Get Me High" and a coupon for $2 off the price of the album were released.

"Forgotten Man" and "Fault Lines" were released for streaming on the band's website in early July 2014. Additionally, all five tracks released in promotion of Hypnotic Eye were released on an "interactive radio" with a tuning dial that finds the tracks for listeners.

Commercial performance
The album debuted at No. 1 on the Billboard 200 chart, with first-week sales of 131,000 copies in the United States; to date, it is the only Tom Petty (solo or with the Heartbreakers) album to reach the top spot on the chart.

Track listing

Personnel
Tom Petty and the Heartbreakers

Tom Petty – vocals (all tracks), rhythm guitar (all tracks but 10), lead guitar (right channel on track 9, track 10, track 11 outro), fuzz bass (track 3), high bass (track 7), bass (track 9)
Mike Campbell – lead guitar (tracks 1-8, left channel on track 9, 11), rhythm guitar (track 10, 12)
Benmont Tench – piano (tracks 1-7, 10-12), electric piano (track 1, 6, 11) organ (1-3, 5-9, 11-12), mellotron (tracks 4, 8, 11), synthesizer (track 5) 
Scott Thurston – rhythm guitar (tracks 1, 3, 5-8, 11), 12-string guitar (track 4), harmonica (track 2, 10, 12) tambourine (track 9), lead guitar (track 12)
Ron Blair – bass guitar (all tracks but 9)
Steve Ferrone – drums (all tracks), percussion (track 6, 7, 12)

Additional musicians

Josh Jové – fuzz guitar (track 7)
Ryan Ulyate – background vocals (track 8)

Production

Chris Bellman – mastering
Mike Campbell – producer
Jeri Heiden – art direction
Josh Jové – assistant engineer
Greg Looper – engineer
Tom Petty – producer
Chase Simpson – assistant engineer
Nick Steinhardt – design, art direction
Ryan Ulyate – producer, mixer, recorder
Alan "Bugs" Weidel – crew chief, back-line technician, equipment manager

Charts
Weekly charts

Year-end charts

References

External links

Tom Petty albums
2014 albums
Albums produced by Tom Petty
Reprise Records albums
Blues rock albums by American artists